Neolarnaudia is a genus of freshwater crabs, in the subfamily Potamiscinae and found in Vietnam.  Data are deficient concerning their IUCN Red List of Threatened Species status.

Species
 Neolarnaudia botti Türkay & Naiyanetr, 1987
 Neolarnaudia phymatodes (Kemp, 1923)

References

External links

Potamoidea
Freshwater crustaceans of Asia